Robin Bacul (born August 6, 1979) is a Czech former professional hockey player. He was selected 173rd overall by the Ottawa Senators in the 1997 NHL Entry Draft. He has played most of his career in the Czech Extraliga league, with teams such as Slavia Praha HC, Karlovy Vary HC, and Havirov Femax HC. He also played one year in the QMJHL for the Chicoutimi Sagueneens.

Career statistics

External links
 

1979 births
Chicoutimi Saguenéens (QMJHL) players
Czech ice hockey left wingers
GKS Tychy (ice hockey) players
HC Berounští Medvědi players
HC Havířov players
HC Karlovy Vary players
HC Slavia Praha players
KH Zagłębie Sosnowiec players
Living people
Motor České Budějovice players
Ottawa Senators draft picks
Piráti Chomutov players
VHK Vsetín players
Sportspeople from Ostrava
Czech expatriate ice hockey players in Canada
Czech expatriate sportspeople in Poland
Expatriate ice hockey players in Poland